Michael Gallagher (born 9 May 1966) is a former Australian rules footballer who played with Carlton and North Melbourne in the Australian Football League (AFL).

Notes

External links

Michael Gallagher's profile at Blueseum

1966 births
Carlton Football Club players
North Melbourne Football Club players
Golden Square Football Club players
Australian rules footballers from Victoria (Australia)
Living people
Victorian State of Origin players